Luizi-Călugăra is a commune in Bacău County, Western Moldavia, Romania. It is composed of two villages, Luizi-Călugăra and Osebiți.

History and demographics

Luizi-Călugăra was established in the 18th century by Hungarian Catholic settlers. During the  20th century, Romanianisation linguistically assimilated the Hungarian population. At the 2002 census, 99.7% of inhabitants declared themselves as ethnic Romanians, 0.2% as Csangos and 0.1% as Hungarians. 98.6% were Roman Catholic, 1.1% Romanian Orthodox and 0.2% Seventh-day Adventist.

Historical population

1898 - 1878 (1802 Hungarians) - G. I. Lahovari: Marele Dictionar Geografic al Romaniei 
1930 - 1879 (1800 Hungarians)- Romanian census
2002 - 4590 (5 Hungarians)- Romanian census

Natives
Elena Horvat, Olympic rower

Notes

Communes in Bacău County
Localities in Western Moldavia